Tetrahydrocortisone, or urocortisone, is a steroid and an inactive metabolite of cortisone.

See also
 Tetrahydrocortisol
 Tetrahydrocorticosterone

References

Human metabolites
Corticosteroids